{{Infobox video game
| title = The Metronomicon: Slay the Dance Floor
| image = File:The_Metronomicon_Slay_the_Dance_Floor_Deluxe_Edition_2017_PlayStation_4_Digital_Cover_Art.jpg
| director = 
| producer = 
| designer = 
| programmer = 
| artist = 
| writer = 
| composer = 
| developer = Puuba
| publisher = Akupara Games
| platforms = Microsoft Windows, macOS, PlayStation 4, Xbox One
| released = Microsoft Windows, macOS September 29, 2016PlayStation 4 August 29, 2017Xbox One August 30, 2017| genre = Rhythm game
}}The Metronomicon: Slay the Dance Floor is a rhythm game developed by American indie studio Puuba. The Metronomicon: Slay the Dance Floor was originally released on September 29, 2016, for Microsoft Windows and macOS, under the name "The Metronomicon". On August 29, 2017, Puuba added new content and released the game for PlayStation 4 and Xbox One on August 30, 2017 under the expanded name "The Metronomicon: Slay the Dance Floor".

GameplayThe Metronomicon: Slay the Dance Floor'' combines elements from rhythm and role-playing genres. During battles, the player hit notes to the beat of the soundtrack while switching between their team of four heroes. Heroes cast spells and activate abilities by completing rhythm sequences in lanes that scroll over their heads while electronic and indie rock tracks play. Monsters appear on the right side of the screen while the music plays, new ones swapping in as others are knocked. Players must swap between tracks on-the-fly in order to heal, cast elemental damage spells and cast buffs and debuffs. Successfully hitting notes allows the player to launch attacks or defenses against different enemies throughout the songs and levels. The re-release (entitled "Slay the Dance Floor") added new playable characters, passive abilities, Endless Mode, and a cooperative option for all modes of the game.

Plot
Treacherous dance parties are appearing all over the planet. Wherever they arrive, dangerous monster congregate to dance, knocking down all in their path. A band of heroes from a specialized Dance Academy must travel around to investigate these parties, defeat the monsters, and discover the source of these musical invasions.

Reception

According to review aggregator website Metacritic, the game scores has 7.9/10, while on Gamerankings it received a total of 81.50%.

References

External links

2016 video games
PlayStation 4 games
Action role-playing video games
Music video games
Video games developed in the United States
Video games scored by Grant Henry
Windows games
Xbox One games
Akupara Games games
Multiplayer and single-player video games